The 2016 Women's National League is the sixth season of the Women's National League, the highest women's association football league in the Republic of Ireland. It is a reduced season, running from 6 August to 4 December 2016, held prior to the introduction of single-year league seasons from 2017 onward.

On the second last matchday Shelbourne Ladies beat UCD Waves to secure their first Women's National League title.

Teams

Castlebar Celtic did not return after withdrawing mid-season 2015/16.

Standings

Awards

Annual awards

References

Women's National League (Ireland) seasons
Ireland
Women
1